Corymbia clandestina, commonly known as the Drummond Range bloodwood, is a species of small tree that is endemic to Queensland. It has rough, tessellated bark on the trunk and branches, lance-shaped adult leaves, flower buds in groups of seven, white flowers and urn-shaped to barrel-shaped fruit.

Description
It has rough, tessellated greyish bark on the trunk and branches. Flowering has been observed in February and the flowers are white.

Taxonomy and naming
This species was first formally described in 1994 by Anthony Bean who gave it the name Eucalyptus clandestina and published the description in the journal Austrobaileya from specimens he collected near Clermont on the road to Alpha in 1990. In 1995 Ken Hill and Lawrie Johnson changed the name to Corymbia clandestina. The specific epithet (clandestina) is from the Latin word clandestinus meaning "secret" or "hidden", referring to this species often being hidden amongst ironbarks.

Distribution and habitat
Corymbia clandestina is only known from a few occurrences near Clermont and Blair Athol where it often grows in woodland with Eucalyptus crebra and E. melanophloia.

Conservation status
This bloodwood is classified as "vulnerable" under the Australian Government Environment Protection and Biodiversity Conservation Act 1999 and under the Queensland Government Nature Conservation Act 1992. The main threats to the species are grazing by domestic stock and by mining exploration.

See also
 List of Corymbia species

References

clandestina
Myrtales of Australia
Flora of Queensland
Plants described in 1994